Jean Roba (28 July 1930 – 14 June 2006) was a Belgian comics author from the Marcinelle school. His best-known work is Boule et Bill.

Biography
Jean Roba was born in Schaerbeek, Belgium. In his youth, he was a reader of French magazines like Robinson and Mickey, which featured mainly American comics. One of those that was especially influential on Roba was Katzenjammer Kids. After working as an illustrator for different magazines and publicity agencies, he started to work as an illustrator for Spirou magazine in 1957, where he made small cartoons for the front page for a few years. He also worked on Bonnes Soirées, another magazine from the same publisher Dupuis, where he continued the series Sa majesté mon mari after Albert Uderzo stopped. For Spirou, he made a few short stories with Yvan Delporte and collaborated on different stories of Spirou et Fantasio with André Franquin, who taught him the basics of making comics, before starting his own main series Boule et Bill in 1959, initially with stories by Maurice Rosy. Next to this series of mainly one-page comics, he started in 1962 La Ribambelle about a group of kids from various countries and racial backgrounds.

Roba was both an artist and writer, and wrote most of his own gags for Boule et Bill, while others contributed stories for La Ribambelle. He handed over the drawing of Boule et Bill to Laurent Verron after more than 1000 pages. His work has been translated in fourteen languages and has sold in excess of 25 million copies. He lived in Jette from 1951 until his death in Brussels in 2006.

In 2005, he ended on No. 100 in the election for Le plus grand Belge (The Greatest Belgian). On 6 June 2006, Roba died in Brussels, Belgium of natural causes at the age of 75.

Bibliography

Awards
 1978: Angoulême International Comics Festival, Best foreign comical work, for Boule et Bill
 1981: Angoulême International Comics Festival, Best comic for 9 to 12 years old, for Boule et Bill: Bill est maboul 
 1992: Chevalier des Arts et Lettres, France
Roba was also a Knight in the Order of Léopold.

Sources

 Roba publications in Spirou, Pif gadget BDoubliées 
 Roba albums Bedetheque 

Footnotes

External links
Jean Roba biography on Lambiek Comiclopedia
Jean Roba biography on Dupuis
Jean Roba 2001 interview, with many drawings on BD Paradisio 
Interview in 2006 on Objectible.net 

1930 births
2006 deaths
People from Schaerbeek
Belgian comics artists
Belgian comics writers
Belgian humorists